Lithium metasilicate is an ionic compound with the formula Li2SiO3

Preparation
Lithium metasilicate is prepared by the reaction of lithium carbonate and silicon dioxide at temperatures between 515 and 565 °C.

Applications
The melting of lithium metasilicate is used for the calibration of thermocouples.

References

Inorganic silicon compounds
Lithium compounds
Metasilicates